Astragalus andersonii is a species of milkvetch known by the common name Anderson's milkvetch. It is native to eastern California and western Nevada, where it is found in the plateaus at the foot of the Sierra Nevada, including the Modoc Plateau.  It was named after Charles Lewis Anderson by Asa Gray.

Description
This is a small perennial herb forming a thick patch on the ground, the stems reaching about 20 centimeters in maximum length. The plant is coated in dense gray to white wavy hairs. The leaves are up to 10 centimeters long and made up of several oval-shaped leaflets. The inflorescence is a projecting or upright array of 12 to 26 pealike flowers. Each flower is white, often purple-tinted or purple-veined, and between 1 and 2 centimeters long. The fruit is a curved legume pod 1 to 2 centimeters long.

It is coated in very long white hairs and dries to a thick papery texture, the beans inside rattling with the wind.

References

External links
Jepson Manual Treatment of Astragalus andersonii
USDA Plants Profile for Astragalus andersonii
UC CalPhotos gallery

andersonii
Flora of California
Flora of Nevada
Flora of the Great Basin
Flora of the Sierra Nevada (United States)
~
Endemic flora of the United States
Plants described in 1865
Flora without expected TNC conservation status